Welsh 0-6-2T locomotives were a standard steam locomotive of the railways of South Wales. Many of the independent railways used them and, at the grouping of 1923, the survivors passed into Great Western Railway (GWR) stock. The GWR perpetuated the type in the GWR 5600 Class. The other major railway company in Wales, the LNWR, also had the LNWR Webb Coal Tank Class, though this was grouped into the LMS not the GWR.

Overview
The railways of South Wales seem to have had a particular liking for the 0-6-2T type. This was because the nature of the work they undertook demanded high adhesive weight, plenty of power with good braking ability, but no need for outright speed, nor large tanks or bunker as the distances from pit to port were short.  These Welsh locomotives were taken over by the GWR at the grouping in 1923 and many were rebuilt with GWR taper boilers.

Numbering
Many Welsh 0-6-2T locomotives passed into British Railways (BR) ownership in 1948 and these included (with some gaps in numbering). GWR engines all retained their numbers upon nationalisation.

 Rhymney Railway, BR numbers 30-83
 Cardiff Railway, BR number 155
 Barry Railway, BR numbers (random) 198-231 and 238-277 (the Barry Railway locomotives had all been withdrawn by 1952 so they are less well-documented than the others)
 Taff Vale Railway, BR numbers (random) 204-420 and 438-440
 Brecon and Merthyr Railway, BR numbers 422-436

Railways

Barry Railway

Brecon and Merthyr Railway

Neath and Brecon Railway

Port Talbot Railway

Rhymney Railway

The Rhymney Railway's A, M and R classes were successful designs ideally suited to hauling heavy coal trains a relatively short distance.  In 1926, No 17 was reboilered by the GWR and in this form was visually almost indistinguishable from the GWR 5600 Class.

These three classes (and the larger wheeled P class) were designed for work on the Rhymney Railway, replacing smaller locomotives.  When the smaller railway companies were forcibly merged into the GWR in 1923, these modern 0-6-2Ts were in generally good order (some were a few months old) and had proved successful. Collectively they became the blueprint for the 200 strong GWR 5600 class.

The design of the 5600 followed the Rhymney designs quite closely but adopted GWR practice as far as possible, by utilising many standardized parts. Included in Collett's innovations was a standard number 2 boiler which was suitable for the 5600 (and the M and R class Rhymney locomotives), complete with the traditional copper GWR safety valve casing and copper-capped chimney. Some A and P classes were also rebuilt but used the slightly shorter standard number 10 boiler, also to good effect.

Five R class locos were upgraded from 1926 onwards. All told sixteen "Stephenson" locos were similarly dealt with between 1926 and 1949.

Taff Vale Railway

References

External links 
 5600 class
 5643
 6695

0-6-2T locomotives
Standard gauge steam locomotives of Great Britain